Ščit is a dispersed settlement in the Municipality of Šmartno pri Litiji in central Slovenia. It lies in the hills west of Šmartno. The area is part of the historical region of Lower Carniola. The municipality is included in the Central Slovenia Statistical Region.

Name
Ščit was attested in written sources as Schilt in 1404 and Schiltt in 1499.

References

External links
Ščit at Geopedia

Populated places in the Municipality of Šmartno pri Litiji